The 2001–02 Essex Senior Football League season was the 31st in the history of Essex Senior Football League a football competition in England.

League table

The league featured 15 clubs which competed in the league last season, along with one new club:
Enfield Town, new club

League table

References

Essex Senior Football League seasons
2001–02 in English football leagues